Alebrijes de Oaxaca Fútbol Club Premier is a Mexican football team based in the city of Oaxaca, state of Oaxaca. They play in the third tier of Mexican football league, Serie B de México. The team is the second squad of the club Alebrijes de Oaxaca and was founded on 2013, dissolved on 2015 and resumed on July 30, 2021.

History
Alebrijes de Oaxaca was founded in December 2012 from the move of Tecamachalco F.C., due to the fact that this club could not compete in the Ascenso MX. However, since its creation, the club has maintained affiliated teams competing in lower categories of Mexican soccer in order to give its young players minutes to play. 

Between 2013 and 2015 the affiliated team had the same name as the club, later in 2015 it was relocated to Malinalco and renamed Colibríes de Malinalco, finally between 2017 and 2018 the team was named Tecamachalco F.C. and was moved to Huixquilucan de Degollado.

In 2019, the club changed owners, so the new board decided to eliminate the policy of affiliated teams and return to developing their own squads. Between 2020 and 2021, Alebrijes maintained an agreement with C.D. Cuautla to send some of his players on loan so that they had professional experience. 

On July 30, 2021, the return of the team was made official to take part in the Liga Premier de México, which was formed with players from the Liga TDP team, the youth squads and footballers from other clubs.

Stadium

The Estadio Tecnológico de Oaxaca is a multi-use stadium in Oaxaca City, Oaxaca, Mexico. It is currently used mostly for football matches and is the home stadium for Alebrijes de Oaxaca. The stadium has a capacity of 14,598 people and also includes 72 luxury boxes.

Players

References

Association football clubs established in 2013
Football clubs in Oaxaca
2013 establishments in Mexico
Liga Premier de México